Devan Wray (born October 2, 1979 in Edmonton, Alberta) is a lacrosse coach and former transition player. He wore #4 for the Calgary Roughnecks in the National Lacrosse League.  He was also the defence coach for the Edmonton Rush in 2012 & 2013.  Wray has been named the head coach of Team Finland for the 2015 FIL World Indoor Lacrosse Championship.

Prior to the 2011 NLL season, Wray was traded to the Edmonton Rush for a 6th round pick in the 2011 NLL Entry Draft. The Roughnecks later signed Wray off of the Rush practice roster after an injury to Nolan Heavenor before he played any games for the Rush.

Wray's brother Taylor Wray was also a professional lacrosse player.  Both of them played college lacrosse for Duke Blue Devils men's lacrosse.  He won the Champion's Cup with the Roughnecks in both 2004 and 2009.  He also has two Minto Cups with the Burnaby Lakers.

Statistics

NLL
Reference:

References

1979 births
Living people
Calgary Roughnecks players
Canadian lacrosse players
Duke Blue Devils men's lacrosse players
Lacrosse transitions
Sportspeople from Edmonton